Alejandro Carranza (born November 27, 1993) known professionally as OhGeesy, is an American rapper from Los Angeles. He is noted as a founding member of the hip hop group Shoreline Mafia. In 2021, with the group's apparent disbandment, OhGeesy has shifted towards a solo career with the release of his debut solo album Geezyworld which peaked at number 102 on the Billboard 200.

Career

Shoreline Mafia
OhGeesy started rapping alongside members of Shoreline Mafia in 2012. He met member Fenix Flexin while doing graffiti in Los Angeles. In 2016, Shoreline Mafia became a fully-formed rap group.

Solo career
In February 2021, he appeared on American rapper Drakeo the Ruler's single "For Real" and its subsequent music video alongside American rapper Ketchy the Great. In May 2021, he released his single "Get Fly" with American rapper DaBaby alongside a music video directed by Austin Simkins. In July 2021, he released the music video for his track "Big Bad Wolf", a collaboration with American rapper YG. In August 2021, he released his debut solo album Geezyworld with appearances from A Boogie wit da Hoodie, DaBaby, YG, Central Cee, BlueBucksClan, and Moe Faygoo.

Personal life
He became a father in March 2019.

In October 2021, during an interview with HipHopDX, OhGeesy spoke about his struggle with drug addiction and how it almost caused him to retire from music.

Legal issues
In August 2019, he was removed from Disneyland after making alleged gun threats. In September 2022, he was arrested on charges of loaded gun and codeine possession.

References

External links 
 
 

1993 births
21st-century American male musicians
Living people
People from Los Angeles
People from California
Rappers from Los Angeles
Year of birth missing (living people)
American rappers of Mexican descent
Hispanic and Latino American musicians
West Coast hip hop musicians